Yehuda Bauer (born April 6, 1926) is a Czech-born Israeli historian and scholar of the Holocaust. He is a professor of Holocaust Studies at the Avraham Harman Institute of Contemporary Jewry at the Hebrew University of Jerusalem.

Biography
Yehuda Bauer was born in Prague, Czechoslovakia and fluent in Czech, Slovak and German. He later learned Hebrew, Yiddish, English, French and Polish. His father had strong Zionist convictions and during the 1930s he tried to raise money to relocate his family to the British Mandate of Palestine. On the day Nazi Germany annexed Czechoslovakia, March 15, 1939, the family immigrated to Palestine by managing to get past Nazi officials on a train which slipped them over the border into Poland. From there they moved via Romania to Palestine.

Bauer attended high school in Haifa and at sixteen, inspired by his history teacher, Rachel Krulik, he decided to dedicate himself to studying history. Upon completing high school, he joined the Palmach. He attended Cardiff University in Wales on a British scholarship, interrupting his studies to fight in the 1948 Arab-Israeli War, after which he completed his degree.

Bauer returned to Israel to join Kibbutz Shoval and began his graduate work in history at the Hebrew University. He received his doctorate in 1960 for a thesis on the British Mandate of Palestine. The following year, he began teaching at the Institute for Contemporary Jewry at the Hebrew University.

He served on the central committee of Mapam, then the junior partner party of Israel's ruling Mapai (Israel Labour Party), and was a visiting professor at Brandeis University, Yale University, Richard Stockton College, and Clark University. He was the founding editor of the journal Holocaust and Genocide Studies, and served on the editorial board of the Encyclopaedia of the Holocaust, published by Yad Vashem in 1990.

Views and opinions
Bauer specializes in  the Holocaust, antisemitism —a word which he insists should be written unhyphenated—and the Jewish resistance movement during the Holocaust, and he has argued for a wider definition of the term. In Bauer's view, resistance to the Nazis comprised not only physical opposition but any activity that gave the Jewish people dignity and humanity in the most humiliating and inhumane conditions. Furthermore, Bauer has disputed the popular view that most Jews went to their deaths passively—"like sheep to the slaughter". He argues that, given the conditions in which the Jews of Eastern Europe had to endure, what is surprising is not how little resistance there was, but rather how much. Bauer has defended Rudolf Kastner and the Aid and Rescue Committee, who have been criticized for allegedly not publicizing the Vrba-Wetzler report which documented the deportation of the Hungarian Jews to Auschwitz. According to Bauer, conditions prevented Kastner and other Jewish leaders from publicizing what they knew, and prevented Jews from escaping.

Bauer believes that Hitler was the key figure who caused the Holocaust, and that at some point in the later half of 1941, he gave a series of orders which called for the genocide of the entire Jewish population. Bauer has pointed to the discovery of an entry in Himmler's notebook dated December 18, 1941 where Himmler wrote down the question "What to do with the Jews of Russia?" According to the same notebook, Hitler's response to the question was "Exterminate them as partisans." In Bauer's view, this is as close as historians will ever get to a definitive order from Hitler ordering the Holocaust. Bauer believes that, at about the same time, Hitler gave further verbal orders for the Holocaust, but unfortunately for historians, nobody bothered to write them down. What the Nazis called the "Final Solution of the Jewish Question" is considered to have been formalized at the Wannsee Conference on January 20, 1942, although Bauer has rejected this view, calling it a "silly story”.

Bauer disagrees with those who argue that the Holocaust was just another genocide. Though he agrees that there were other genocides in history, he argues that the Holocaust was the worst single case of genocide in history, in which every member of a nation was selected for annihilation. American historian Henry Friedlander argues that the Romani and the disabled were just as much victims of the Holocaust as the Jews were.  However, Bauer has said that the Romani were subject to genocide (just not "the Holocaust") and he has supported the demands of the Romani for reparations from Germany.

Another trend that Bauer has denounced is the representation of the Holocaust as a mystical experience outside the normal range of human understanding. He has argued against the work of some Orthodox rabbis and theologians who say that the Holocaust was the work of God and part of a mysterious master plan for the Jewish people. In Bauer's view, those who seek to promote this line of thinking argue that God is just and good, while simultaneously bringing down the Holocaust on the Jewish people. Bauer has argued that a God who inflicts the Shoah on his Chosen People is neither good nor just. Moreover, Bauer has argued that this line of reasoning robs Adolf Hitler of his evil: if Hitler was just fulfilling God's will regarding the Jews, then he was merely an instrument of divine wrath and did not choose to be evil. 

In January 2012, Bauer's article in the Israel Journal of Foreign Affairs entitled "The Holocaust, America and American Jewry" precipitated a bitter debate between him, Rafael Medoff (Wyman Institute) and Alexander J. Groth (University of California, Davis), on what the US Government and the Jews of America could and could not have done to rescue the Jews of Europe. Bauer has criticized the American political scientist Daniel Goldhagen, who writes that the Holocaust was the result of the allegedly unique "eliminationist" antisemitic culture of the Germans. He has accused Goldhagen of Germanophobic racism, and of only selecting evidence which is favorable to his thesis.

In 2003, Bauer stated that "What we have here between the Israelis and the Palestinians is an armed conflict - if one side becomes stronger there is a chance of genocide." When one of the visitors asked, "Am I to understand that you think Israel could commit genocide on the Palestinian people?," Bauer answered "Yes," and added, "Just two days ago, extremist settlers passed out flyers to rid Arabs from this land. Ethnic cleansing results in mass killing." Bauer said that opinion polls show that a high percentage of Palestinians want to get rid of Jews.

Bauer was one of the architects of the Working Definition of Antisemitism, which classifies mainstream Palestinian positions as antisemitic. He has argued that calling for Palestinian right of return is antisemitic because he believes it is a prelude to the genocide of Jews.

Concerning Pope Benedict XVI's pilgrimage to Israel and Jordan, Bauer argued that the Pope meant well and tried to walk the tightrope between Arab-Palestinian-Muslim and Palestinian-Christian enmity toward Israel and the Jews on the one hand, and the collective trauma of Jews in Israel and elsewhere regarding the Holocaust on the other.

Awards and recognition

Bauer has received recognition for his work in the field of Holocaust studies and the prevention of genocide.

 In 1998, he was awarded the Israel Prize, for "history of the Jewish people", primarily in connection with his Holocaust studies.
 In 2001, he was elected a Member of the Israel Academy of Sciences and Humanities.
 In 2005, he was awarded the Illis quorum by the Swedish government.
 In 2008, he received the Yakir Yerushalayim (Worthy Citizen of Jerusalem) award from the city of Jerusalem.

In addition, he serves as an academic adviser to Yad Vashem, academic adviser to the Task Force for International Cooperation on Holocaust Education, Remembrance, and Research, and senior adviser to the Swedish Government on the International Forum on Genocide Prevention.

Published works

Authored books
 The initial organization of the Holocaust survivors in Bavaria, Jerusalem: Yad Vashem, 1970
 From diplomacy to Resistance: A history of Jewish Palestine. Philadelphia: Jewish Publication Society of America, 1970. Translated from Hebrew by Alton M. Winters.
 Flight and rescue: Brichah. New York: Random House, 1970
 They chose life: Jewish resistance in the Holocaust. New York: The American Jewish Committee, 1973
 Rescue operations through Vilna, Jerusalem: Yad Vashem, 1973
 My brother's keeper: A history of the American Jewish Joint Distribution Committee. Philadelphia: The Jewish Publication Society of America, 1974
 The Holocaust and the struggle of the Yishuv as factors in the establishment of the State of Israel. [Jerusalem]: [Yad Vashem 1976]
 Trends in Holocaust research, Jerusalem: Yad Vashem, 1977
 The Holocaust in historical perspective. Seattle: University of Washington Press, 1978
 The Judenraete: some conclusions. [Jerusalem]: [Yad Vashem, 1979]
 The Jewish emergence from powerlessness. Toronto: University of Toronto Press, 1979
 The Holocaust as historical experience: Essays and a discussion, New York: Holmes & Meier, 1981
 American Jewry and the Holocaust. The American Jewish Joint Distribution Committee,. Detroit: Wayne State University Press, 1981 
 Jewish foreign policy during the Holocaust. New York: 1984
 Jewish survivors in DP camps and She'erith Hapletah, Jerusalem: Yad Vashem, 1984
 Antisemitism today: Myth and reality. Jerusalem: Hebrew University. Institute of Contemporary Jewry, 1985
 Antisemitism in Western Europe. 1988
 ed., Present-day Antisemitism: Proceedings of the Eighth International Seminar of the Study Circle on World Jewry under the auspices of the President of Israel, Chaim Herzog, Jerusalem 29–31 December 1985. Jerusalem: The Vidal Sassoon International Center for the Study of Antisemitism, The Hebrew University, 1988
 Out of the ashes: The impact of American Jews on post-Holocaust European Jewry. Oxford: Pergamon Press, c. 1989
 The mission of Joel Brand. 1989
 ed., Remembering for the future: Working papers and addenda. Oxford: Pergamon Press, 1989
 Jewish reactions to the Holocaust. Tel-Aviv: MOD Books, 1989
 Résistance et passivité juive face à l'Holocauste. 1989
 Out of the Ashes. Oxford, Pergamon Press, 1989
 Antisemitism and anti-Zionism—New and old. 1990
 World War II. 1990
 Is the Holocaust explicable? 1990
 La place d'Auschwitz dans la Shoah. 1990
 The Brichah: Jerusalem: Yad Vashem, 1990
 The Holocaust, religion and Jewish history. 1991
 Who was responsible and when? Some well-known documents revisited. 1991
 Holocaust and genocide. Some comparisons. 1991
 The tragedy of the Slovak Jews within the framework of Nazi policy towards the Jews in general, 1992
 Vom christlichen Judenhass zum modernen Antisemitismus—Ein Erklaerungsversuch. 1992
 On the applicability of definitions—Anti-Semitism in present-day Europe. 1993
 Antisemitism as a European and world problem. 1993
 The Wannsee "Conference" and its significance for the "Final Solution". 1993
 Antisemitism in the 1990s. 1993
 The significance of the Final Solution. 1994
 Jews for sale?: Nazi-Jewish negotiations,. New Haven: Yale University Press, October 1994
 The Impact of the Holocaust. Thousand Oaks, CA: Sage, 1996
 A history of the Holocaust. New York: Franklin Watts, 1982, 2001
 Rethinking the Holocaust. Haven, Yale University, 2001
 The Jews - A Contrary People. LIT Verlag, 2014,

Book chapters
"Gypsies", in Yisrael Gutman and Michael Berenbaum, eds., Anatomy of the Auschwitz death camp, Bloomington: Indiana University Press, in association with the United States Holocaust Memorial Museum, Washington, D.C. 1994.

Edited conference papers
Menachem Z. Rosensaft and Yehuda Bauer (eds.), Antisemitism: threat to Western civilization. Jerusalem: Vidal Sassoon International Center for the Study of Antisemitism, The Hebrew University of Jerusalem, 1989. . (Papers based on a conference held at the New York University School of Law, 27 October 1985).
 Yehuda Bauer (ed.), The danger of Antisemitism in Central and Eastern Europe in the wake of 1989-1990. Jerusalem: The Vidal Sassoon International Center for the Study of Antisemitism, The Hebrew University of Jerusalem: 1991.  (Based on a conference held October 28–29, 1990, in Jerusalem)

See also
List of Israel Prize recipients

References

External links

 Bio at ADL
 interview at KQED Forum January 11, 2005 (audio)
 Address to the Bundestag January 27, 1998
 1998 Interview (PDF)
 1993 Interview
 at Yad VaShem
 at HUJI
 Lectures at Researchchannel
 The “Final Solution” - A Bureaucratic Process or an Ideological Genocide? Excerpt from interview with Bauer
 Yehuda Bauer at Memory of Nation site.

1926 births
Living people
Alumni of Cardiff University
Clark University faculty
Czechoslovak emigrants to Mandatory Palestine
Czechoslovak Jews
Academic staff of the Hebrew University of Jerusalem
Historians of the Holocaust
Israel Prize in history recipients
EMET Prize recipients in the Humanities
Israeli historians
Jewish historians
Members of the Israel Academy of Sciences and Humanities
Naturalized citizens of Israel
Palmach members
People from Shoval
Scholars of antisemitism
Yad Vashem people
Yiddish-speaking people
Articles containing video clips
Recipients of the Illis quorum